UWM Holdings Corporation is a national wholesale mortgage lending company headquartered in Pontiac, Michigan. UWM underwrites and provides closing documentation for residential mortgage loans originated by independent mortgage brokers, correspondents, small banks and local credit unions across all 50 states and the District of Columbia.

History
Jeff Ishbia started United Wholesale Mortgage in 1986 as a side project from his career as an attorney, initially calling the company Shore Mortgage before changing the name to United Wholesale Mortgage.

In 2002, United Wholesale Mortgage was established as a subsidiary, of United Shore Financial Services. In 2013, Mat Ishbia was named President and CEO.

In 2019, the company purchased a second building across the street in Pontiac, Michigan, to connect the two buildings totaling their square footage to over 1.5 million square feet of space. In November of 2020, expanded its Pontiac campus with the purchase of the UWM Sports Complex facility for $23.3 million.

SPAC and public offering
United Wholesale Mortgage went public in January of 2021 through a merger with Gores Holdings IV, and the formation of a special-purpose acquisition company (SPAC). At the time of its formation, the SPAC was the largest to ever debut at a valuation near $16 billion.

Since then, shares have fallen, due to a volatile mortgage and housing market, and a planned second offering has been postponed.

Controversy
In March 2021, United Wholesale Mortgage announced that they would no longer work with any broker or bank that also worked with United Wholesale Mortgage’s leading competitors Rocket Mortgage and Fairway Independent Mortgage Group. At the time, Ishbia claimed the decision was due to the practices of those companies, including working directly with realtors instead of mortgage brokers in securing home loans.

References

External links

Companies listed on the New York Stock Exchange
American companies established in 1986
Financial services companies established in 1986
Financial services companies of the United States
Mortgage lenders of the United States
Special-purpose acquisition companies